Azna (also Romanized as Aznā and Eznā) is a city in and capital of Azna County, Lorestan Province, Iran. At the 2011 census, its population was 41,706, in  11,594  families.

Azna is located in theه Zagros Mountains.

 
This city is located 133  km. east of Khoramabad and 75 km. south of Arak. It experiences cold winters and moderate summers. The city is en route Esfahan  - Khuzestan and is connected to the railway network of the country.

References

External links
 Mother Azna Prayer Wall

Cities in Lorestan Province
Towns and villages in Azna County